Xu Yitian (born November 1947) is a vice admiral (zhongjiang) of the People's Liberation Army Navy (PLAN) of China. He attained the rank of rear admiral (shaojiang) in July 1999, and was promoted to the rank of vice admiral (zhongjiang) in July 2006.

Biography
Xu was born in November 1947. He graduated from PLA Naval University of Engineering. After graduation, he served in the North Sea Fleet. In December 2004, he was appointed Political Commissioner of South Sea Fleet and Deputy Political Commissioner of Guangzhou Military Region, replacing Tong Shiping. He was Political Commissioner of National University of Defense Technology in December 2005, and held that office until July 2010. In May 2016, he was appointed Leader of Inspection Team, Central Military Commission to the Armed Police Force.

He was a member of the 13th Standing Committee of the Chinese People's Political Consultative Conference. He was an alternate member of the 17th CPC Central Committee.

References

1947 births
Living people
PLA Naval University of Engineering alumni
People's Liberation Army Navy admirals